St. Mark's Baptist Church, formerly known as Methodist Episcopal Church of Highland Falls, is a historic Baptist church located in the village of Highland Falls, Orange County, New York. It was completed in 1900 and is a modestly scaled, one-story frame building on a limestone ashlar foundation.  It features a corner steeple with buttressed corners, open belfry, and windows in the Gothic Revival style.

It was listed on the National Register of Historic Places in 2004.

References

External links

Baptist churches in New York (state)
Churches on the National Register of Historic Places in New York (state)
National Register of Historic Places in Orange County, New York
Carpenter Gothic church buildings in New York (state)
Churches completed in 1890
19th-century Baptist churches in the United States
Shingle Style church buildings
Highland Falls, New York
Churches in Orange County, New York
Shingle Style architecture in New York (state)